Nagercoil Junction railway station (station code: NCJ) is a railway junction in Kanyakumari district in the state of Tamil Nadu.

Background

Trivandrum–Nagercoil–Kanniyakumari and Tirunelveli–Nagercoil construction projects were inaugurated by the then Prime minister Mrs.Indira Gandhi on 6 September 1972. The Trivandrum–Nagercoil–Kanniyakumari line was opened on 15 April 1979. Nagercoil Junction became operational on 15 April 1979. The rail-link to Kanniyakumari was established only in 1979, mainly because establishing a rail line through the district posed some challenges for the rail department and took a lot of efforts, especially the western line. The western line runs through some huge artificial ground-elevations and a number of hill-tunnels. Kanyakumari district is connected through direct train services with all leading metropolitan cities in India like New Delhi, Mumbai, Chennai and Kolkata. Most of the train services from this station were the trains, that were extended services from nearest major cities such as Tirunelveli Junction and Thiruvananthapuram Central.

Layout
The station has four platforms (6 PFs Post doubling) connecting the Kanyakumari–Trivandrum line (West Coast Line) of the Thiruvananthapuram railway division to the Chennai– Madurai–Nagercoil line

Lines
 Fully Electrified Single BG Line Towards  Tirunelveli (Doubling are working in progress)
 Fully Electrified Single BG Line Towards Trivandrum (Doubling are working in progress)
 Fully Electrified single BG Line Towards Kanniyakumari ( Doubling are working in progress )

See also 

 Thiruvananthapuram railway division
 Southern Railway zone

References

External links

Railway stations in Kanyakumari district
Thiruvananthapuram railway division
Railway stations opened in 1979
Transport in Nagercoil
Railway junction stations in Tamil Nadu